Salsa Picante is an album by American composer-arranger/keyboardist Clare Fischer, recorded on January 30, 1978, and marking the eponymous recording debut of Fischer's Latin jazz combo. Initially released in 1979 by MPS Records in Germany, the album's U.S. release came the following year on the Trend/Discovery label. Though long unavailable on CD, four of its tracks made it onto MPS's 1998 anthology of Fischer highlights, Latin Patterns, and the album in its entirety was finally reissued on CD in 2007 by Clare Fischer Productions.

Track listing
All selections composed by Clare Fischer except where noted.

Side One
 "Bachi'' – 6:27
 "Morning" – 5:55
 "Guarabe" – 10:17
Side Two
 "Descarga – Yéma Ya" (Clare Fischer/Ildefonso (Poncho) Sanchez) - 6:15
 "Cosmic Flight" – 3:11
 "Inquiétação" (Ary Barroso) – 3:47 
 "Minor Sights – 4:02

Personnel
Clare Fischer – e-piano, Yamaha EX-42 organ
Rick Zunigar – guitar
David Acuña – flute 
David Troncoso –  e-bass
Pete Riso – drums 
Alex Acuña – timbales, Latin percussion
Ildefonso (Poncho) Sanchez – conga, bongos, campana

Notes

References 

1979 albums
Albums arranged by Clare Fischer
Clare Fischer albums
Latin jazz albums by American artists
Discovery Records albums

Albums recorded at Capitol Studios